Tan Eng Bock (29 April 1936 – 30 November 2020) was a Singaporean water polo player. He competed in the men's tournament at the 1956 Summer Olympics.

References

External links
 

1936 births
2020 deaths
Singaporean male water polo players
Olympic water polo players of Singapore
Water polo players at the 1956 Summer Olympics
Place of birth missing
Asian Games medalists in water polo
Asian Games gold medalists for Singapore
Asian Games silver medalists for Singapore
Asian Games bronze medalists for Singapore
Water polo players at the 1954 Asian Games
Water polo players at the 1958 Asian Games
Water polo players at the 1962 Asian Games
Water polo players at the 1966 Asian Games
Medalists at the 1954 Asian Games
Medalists at the 1958 Asian Games
Medalists at the 1962 Asian Games
Medalists at the 1966 Asian Games
20th-century Singaporean people